Konstantinos "Kostas" Patavoukas (alternate spelling: Constantinos "Costas") (born February 3, 1966) is a Greek retired professional basketball player.

Professional career
Patavoukas started his playing career as a youth with Asteras Exarhion, and he later played professionally for the Greek Basket League club AEK Athens. With AEK Athens, Patavoukas was a 2 time Greek Cup finalist, in 1988 and 1992. He moved to the Greek club Panathinaikos, and with them he won the EuroLeague in 1996, in Paris, and 2 Greek League championships, in 1998 and 1999. After playing with Panathinaikos, he played with the Italian League club Virtus Bologna.

National team career
Patavoukas was a member of the senior men's Greek national basketball team. With Greece's senior national team, he played at the following tournaments: the 1989 EuroBasket, the 1990 FIBA World Championship, the 1991 EuroBasket, the 1992 European Olympic Qualifying Tournament, the 1993 EuroBasket, the 1994 FIBA World Championship, the 1995 EuroBasket, the 1996 Summer Olympics, and the 1997 EuroBasket. In 1989, he was a silver medalist at the EuroBasket 1989, in Yugoslavia.

Post-playing career
In July 2007, Patavoukas was appointed the technical director of Ionikos Lamias.

References

External links
FIBA Profile
FIBA Europe Profile
Eurobasket.com Profile
Basketball-Reference.com Profile
Hellenic Basketball Federation Profile 

1966 births
Living people
AEK B.C. players
Basketball players at the 1996 Summer Olympics
Greek men's basketball players
1990 FIBA World Championship players
Greek Basket League players
Olympic basketball players of Greece
Panathinaikos B.C. players
Point guards
Shooting guards
Basketball players from Athens
Virtus Bologna players
Mediterranean Games medalists in basketball
Mediterranean Games bronze medalists for Greece
Competitors at the 1987 Mediterranean Games
1994 FIBA World Championship players